Birch Street may refer to:
 51 Birch Street, 2005 documentary by Doug Block
 Maryland Route 173